Rupanyup is a small town in rural Victoria, Australia. The name Rupanyup is an Aboriginal word meaning 'branch hanging over water'.

The Post Office opened on 22 February 1875 as Karkarooc and was renamed Rupanyup in 1876.

The town used to be in the Shire of Dunmunkle but was allocated to the Shire of Yarriambiack when Victoria's municipalities were re-organized in the 1990s.

The town has an Australian rules football team competing in the Horsham & District Football League.

Golfers play at the course of the Rupanyup Golf Club on Frayne Avenue.

The town has art in the Silo Art Trail which also includes Sheep Hills, Brim, Rosebury, Lascelles and Patchewollock.

References

External links

Community web site
http://siloarttrail.com/home/

Wimmera